The 1997–98 St. John's Red Storm men's basketball team represented St. John's University during the 1997–98 NCAA Division I men's basketball season. The team was coached by Fran Fraschilla in his second year at the school. St. John's home games are played at Alumni Hall and Madison Square Garden and the team is a member of the Big East Conference.

Off season

Departures

Class of 1997 signees

Roster

\

Schedule and results

|-
!colspan=9 style="background:#FF0000; color:#FFFFFF;"| Regular season

|-
!colspan=9 style="background:#FF0000; color:#FFFFFF;"| Big East tournament

|-
!colspan=9 style="background:#FF0000; color:#FFFFFF;"| NCAA tournament

Team players drafted into the NBA

References

St. John's Red Storm men's basketball seasons
St. John's
St John
St John
St. John's